The 2008 ECM Prague Open was a tennis tournament played on outdoor clay courts. It was the 17th edition of the ECM Prague Open, and was part of the Tier IV Series of the 2008 WTA Tour and of the 2008 ATP Challenger Tretorn Serie+. It took place at the I. Czech Lawn Tennis Club in Prague, Czech Republic, from 28 April until 4 May 2008.

The tournament included tennis exhibition involving Thomas Muster and Ctislav Doseděl.

Finals

Men's singles

 Jan Hernych defeated  Lukáš Dlouhý, 4–6, 6–2, 6–4

Women's singles

 Vera Zvonareva defeated  Victoria Azarenka, 7–6(7–2), 6–2
 It was Zvonareva's 1st title of the year, and her 6th overall.

Men's doubles

 Lukáš Dlouhý /  Petr Pála defeated  Dušan Karol /  Jaroslav Pospíšil, 6–7(2–7), 6–4, [10–6]

Women's doubles

 Andrea Hlaváčková /  Lucie Hradecká defeated  Jill Craybas /  Michaëlla Krajicek, 1–6, 6–3, [10–6]

External links
Official website 
Men's Singles draw
Men's Doubles draw

Prague Open
ECM Prague Open
2008
2008 in Czech tennis